The Men's 50 metre rifle three positions singles event took place at 9 October 2010 at the CRPF Campus. There was a qualification held to determine the final participants.

Results

External links
Report

Shooting at the 2010 Commonwealth Games